Paweł Smoliniec (born 23 February 1977) is a Polish judoka.

Achievements

See also
European Judo Championships
History of martial arts
List of judo techniques
List of judoka
Martial arts timeline

References

Polish male judoka
1977 births
Living people
Place of birth missing (living people)